The GM class are a class of diesel locomotives built by Clyde Engineering, Granville for the Commonwealth Railways in several batches between 1951 and 1967. As at January 2014, some remain in service with Aurizon and Southern Shorthaul Railroad.

History

The design was based on the Electro-Motive Diesel EMD F7 locomotive. The first 11 were delivered with EMD 16-567B,  engines and four powered axles with the remainder having 16-567C,  engines and six powered axles. The final 11 were fitted with dynamic braking.

Delivered to operate on the standard gauge Trans-Australian Railway, the first entered service in September 1951. Further orders saw 47 in service by December 1967. They operated on all of Commonwealth Railways's standard gauge lines including those to Broken Hill, Alice Springs, Marree and Adelaide when converted to standard gauge in 1970, 1980 and 1982 respectively.

In January 1972, three (31, 32 & 34) were loaned to the Victorian Railways for use on the North East line. The latter two were returned in May 1976, the former in November 1976.

In July 1975, all were included in the transfer of Commonwealth Railways to Australian National. In 1979, a few operated to Lithgow, New South Wales on trials, while in October 1983, three (23, 24 & 28) were hired to V/Line returning in October 1985.

The GM class were manufactured for standard gauge use, some of the locomotives were converted to operate on  broad gauge for some of their lives.

Apart from one destroyed in an accident in 1985, withdrawals began in 1988. GM1 was placed on a plinth in Port Augusta, GM2 was donated to the National Railway Museum, Port Adelaide and GM3 to Clyde Engineering, Kelso. By October 1994, only 15 remained in service. A locomotive shortage saw Australian Southern Railroad return GM1 to service in December 1997.

In 1998, Great Northern Rail Services purchased 12 from Australian Southern Railroad. Most were scrapped for parts with only three returning to service seeing use in Melbourne and Sydney. Following Great Northern ceasing operations in 2003, these were sold to Chicago Freight Car Leasing Australia before being resold to Southern Shorthaul Railroad.

In May 2005, Australian Railroad Group forwarded GM30 to Forrestfield workshops to be receive a  engine, as fitted to the CLs. The project was never completed and the shell was scrapped.

In November 2010, the federal Department for Infrastructure & Transport placed GM1 in the custody of Rail Heritage WA. In May 2012, Clyde Engineering sold GM3 to Southern Shorthaul Railroad and it was transferred to their Lithgow State Mine Heritage Park & Railway workshop for overhaul.

As at April 2021, all but 3 of the One Rail Australia units are stored due to more modern power available for freight services in South Australia while the Southern Shorthaul Railroad units are used on infrastructure and grain trains in New South Wales and Victoria.

Status table

References

Notes

Bibliography

A1A-A1A locomotives
Clyde Engineering locomotives
Aurizon diesel locomotives
Co-Co locomotives
Commonwealth Railways diesel locomotives
Railway locomotives introduced in 1951
Standard gauge locomotives of Australia
Diesel-electric locomotives of Australia
Streamlined diesel locomotives